Jenna Bans is an American screenwriter. Bans is a producer and writer on Grey's Anatomy, and is the creator and the co-producer (along with Shonda Rhimes) of Off the Map, a series which premiered on ABC in January 2011, and was cancelled on May 13, 2011. From 2012 to 2014, she was the regular writer and co-executive producer on another Shonda Rhimes created drama, Scandal, on ABC.

In 2014, Bans created pilot Sea of Fire for ABC. In 2015, she created The Family, also for ABC.

Bans is the creator and executive producer of the NBC series Good Girls, which began broadcasting on February 26, 2018.

Personal life 
Bans is married to Superstore creator and writer Justin Spitzer.

Career 
Originally hired as a staff writer for Jerry Bruckheimer's cancelled action TV movie Fearless, Bans became a part of the crew of Desperate Housewives in 2004, working as a staff writer and then working her way to executive story editor. In 2006, she was nominated for a Writers Guild of America Award for the screenplay to the Desperate Housewives episode "Next" and in 2007 she received another nomination for the episode "It Takes Two". Bans co-wrote both episodes together with Kevin Murphy.

In 2017, Bans was inspired by a conversation she had with her mom about current politics to create Good Girls.

As a producer, she uses the banner "Minnesota Logging Company."

Credits

Producing

Writing

External links

References

American soap opera writers
American women screenwriters
Year of birth missing (living people)
Living people
American television producers
American women television producers
American women television writers
Women soap opera writers
Place of birth missing (living people)
21st-century American women